Alanjeq (also Romanized as Alanjaq; also known as Alanjeh, Alenjeh, Alindzha, Alinja, and ‘Alīnjeh) is a village in Bonab Rural District, in the Central District of Marand County, East Azerbaijan Province, Iran. At the 2006 census, its population was 1,408, in 333 families.

References 

Populated places in Marand County